Caronport is a village in the Canadian province of Saskatchewan within the Rural Municipality of Caron No. 162 and Census Division No. 7.

History 
Caronport incorporated as a village on January 1, 1988. It was named for the predecessor World War II British Commonwealth training base for pilots near the hamlet of Caron, i.e. Caron Airport. The airbase, RCAF Station Caron, operated from December 17, 1941 to January 14, 1944. Although the runways are now all defunct, the layout of the village was determined by the original runway placement.

Demographics 

Caronport is the largest village in Saskatchewan by population.

Education 
Briercrest College and Seminary
Briercrest College and Seminary is a private Christian post-secondary educational institution. It consists of a college and a seminary, both of which offer Christian education. Since 1963, every year in February, Briercrest has hosted a teen youth conference known as Youth Quake.

Briercrest Christian Academy
The Briercrest Christian Academy is a Christian high school. It offers small class sizes and athletics and arts opportunities. It is operated by Briercrest College and Seminary, and shares many facilities with the college such as cafeteria, gymnasium, and chapel.

Caronport Elementary School
Caronport Elementary is a Kindergarten to Grade 8 school, with an enrollment of about 115 students, and is part of the Prairie South School Division.

See also

 List of communities in Saskatchewan
 List of villages in Saskatchewan

References

Villages in Saskatchewan
Caron No. 162, Saskatchewan
Division No. 7, Saskatchewan